Eugen Eckert (born 1954) is a German social worker, minister, singer-songwriter and academic teacher. He is known for his lyrics for new spiritual songs (Neues Geistliches Lied), and his oratorios and musical plays.

Career 
Born in Frankfurt am Main, Eckert first worked as a social worker. He studied from 1977 Protestant theology, pedagogic psychology and Slavic languages at the Frankfurt University and the Mainz University. In 1990 he became the minister of the Protestant parish of Offenbach-Lauterborn. He has been a minister for students (Studentenpfarrer) of the Frankfurt University since 1996, and is the minister of the stadium Commerzbank-Arena. He has also worked for broadcasters and wrote books. From 1993 to 2013 he lectured at the Hochschule für Musik und Darstellende Kunst Frankfurt am Main.

Eckert wrote from 1976 lyrics of Neues Geistliches Lied, producing more than thousand songs, ten oratorios, several Singspiele and cantatas. He was in 1975 founding member of the band Habakuk, for which he has worked as songwriter, singer and manager. Eckert was active in the Arbeitskreis Kirchenmusik und Jugendseelsorge im Bistum Limburg from 1980. When Franz-Peter Tebartz-van Elst, then the bishop, dismissed its president Patrick Dehm as director of the "Haus der Begegnung", Eckert resigned to express his protest.

Eckert is a founding member and vice president of the ecumenical association inTAKT, founded on 8 April 2013 to promote Neues Geistliches Lied.

Selected works 
Eckert wrote the lyrics for more than 1000 songs of the genre Neues Geistliches Lied, oratorios and musical plays. Several songs have been included in the Protestant hymnal Evangelisches Gesangbuch and the Catholic hymnal Gotteslob.

Oratorios 
 Hiob, 1994, music: 
 Daniel, 1996, music: Thomas Gabriel
 Emmaus, 2002, music: Gabriel
 Simeon, 2007, music: Gabriel
 Eleasar, 2008, music: 
 Junia, 2010, music: Gabriel
 Und dann war Licht, 2013, Merseburger Orgeltage, music: Gabriel
 Maria, 2014, music: Gabriel, premiered  29 March 2014, Evangelische Friedenskirche, Ratingen
 Feuerzungen, 2014, music: Peter Reulein, premiered 7 June 2014, Liebfrauen, Frankfurt
 So lang hier stehet Stein auf Stein, 2016, in memory of 350 years plague in Flörsheim
 Bruder Martin, 2017, Luther oratorio, music: Gabriel, premiered on 17 September 2017, open air in Tecklenburg
 Eins, 2021, Ecumenical oratorio for Ökumenischer Kirchentag 2021, text with Helmut Schlegel

Songs 
 "Besser als ich noch", 1999, music: Horst Christill
 "Bewahre uns, Gott", music: 
 "Eingeladen zum Fest des Glaubens", music: Alejandro Veciana
 "Gott, deine Liebe reicht weit", music: Winfried Heurich
 "Gott, der du warst und bist und bleibst", music: Herbert Heine (1993)
 "Gott hat mir längst einen Engel gesandt", music: Thomas Gabriel
 "Jesus Christus, Sohn des Lebens", music: Peter Reulein
 "Lamm Gottes, für uns gegeben", music: Christill
 "Meine engen Grenzen", music: Heurich and Gerhard Fleischer
 "Ob ich sitze oder stehe ("Von allen Seiten umgibst du mich"), music: Torsten Hampel
 "Sehnsucht nach dem ganz Anderen", music: Ludger Stühlmeyer
 "Wäre Gesanges voll unser Mund", music: Veciana
 "Was mein Herz schwer macht", music: Jürgen Kandziora
 "Wir haben seinen Stern gesehen", music: Reulein
 "Wo die Liebe wohnt", music: Veciana

References

External links 
 
 Habakuk
 Wo Blumen den Asphalt aufbrechen gesangbuch-lieder.de

German social workers
German singer-songwriters
Goethe University Frankfurt alumni
Johannes Gutenberg University Mainz alumni
1954 births
Living people
Clergy from Frankfurt
Academic staff of the Frankfurt University of Music and Performing Arts